Beauty and the Beat is the second studio album by American hip hop musician Edan. It was released via Lewis Recordings on March 29, 2005. It features guest appearances from Insight, Percee P, Mr. Lif, and Dagha. It peaked at number 40 on the UK Independent Albums Chart, as well as number 37 on the UK R&B Albums Chart.

Critical reception

At Metacritic, which assigns a weighted average score out of 100 to reviews from mainstream critics, Beauty and the Beat received an average score of 85, based on 18 reviews, indicating "universal acclaim".

Peter Macia of Pitchfork commented that "The gravity of Edan's lyrics and voice on Beauty and the Beat is perhaps its most surprising element" and "[Edan has] gone from a brainiac prankster to the Borges of rap." Nathan Rabin of The A.V. Club said, "the album's brevity is just another old-fashioned value from a rapper-producer-visionary who doesn't need a whole lot of space to make a big statement." Nick Follett of XLR8R called it "one of the best and most original records to come out this decade."

In 2013, NME placed it at number 392 on the "500 Greatest Albums of All Time" list. In 2015, Fact placed it at number 30 on the "100 Best Indie Hip-Hop Records of All Time" list.

Track listing

Charts

References

Further reading

External links
 

2005 albums
Edan (musician) albums